James Edward Platt (December 11, 1878 – ?) was an American college football coach. He was the sixth head football coach at Texas A&M University, serving for three seasons, from 1902 to 1904, and compiling a record of 8–5–3. Platt was born in Laceyville, Pennsylvania.

Head coaching record

References

1878 births
Year of death missing
Texas A&M Aggies football coaches
People from Wyoming County, Pennsylvania